Hilary Bettis is a playwright, a producer, and a writer.

Life and career
She won the 2019 Writers Guild of America Award, and was nominated in 2018, for her work on the Emmy and Golden Globe winning series The Americans on FX, which she wrote on for the final two seasons. Her play, 72 miles to go... was a 2019 finalist for the prestigious Blackburn Prize, and will be produced Off-Broadway by Roundabout Theatre Winter 2020

She is a graduate of the Lila Acheson Wallace Playwright Fellowship at The Juilliard School. Bettis has received fellowships, workshops, and residencies at the Roundabout, Alley All New Festival, Orlando Shakes PlayFest, Bay Area Playwrights Festival, O'Neill National Playwrights Conference, 2050 Fellow at New York Theatre Workshop, John N. Wall Fellow at Sewanee Writers' Conference, SPACE at Ryder Farm, Writer-In-Residence at Cape Cod Theatre Project, La Jolla Playhouse, New York Foundation for the Arts Fellow, Playwrights' Week at The Lark, NNPN's National Showcase of New Plays, Audrey Residency at New Georges, Two River Theater, Great Plains Theatre Conference, WildWind Lab at Texas Tech, The Kennedy Center/NNPN MFA Workshop, and a Sloan/EST Commission. She was also commissioned by Miami New Drama to write Queen of Basel, which ran at the Colony Theatre from April 14, 2018 - May 6, 2018.

She has had plays recognized by The Kilroys every year since its inception. She has been a Runner-Up for the Alliance Theatre's Kendeda Award, Nuestras Voces National Playwriting Competition, American Blues Theater's Blue Ink Award, New America Fellowship, and the Leah Ryan Prize. Bettis is a member of the Dorothy Strelsin New American Writers Group at Primary Stages, Ensemble Studio Theater, a Usual Suspect at NYTW, an Affiliated Artist at New Georges, The Kilroys, and a member of the WGA.

As a screenwriter, Bettis has written and produced three short films. B'Hurst and The Iron Warehouse have screened at multiple film festivals across the globe. Amarillo By Morning, her directorial debut, is currently in post-production. She has developed and sold multiple original TV shows, and is currently developing a project at FX with Propgate, and AMC. And she is an alumna of the prestigious Sundance Institute Episodic TV Lab.

She lives in Brooklyn, NY with her husband, actor Bobby Moreno Her grandfather was of Mexican descent.

Written works

Full-length plays

Short plays

Screenplays

References

External links
 

Living people
Hispanic and Latino American dramatists and playwrights
American writers of Mexican descent
Year of birth missing (living people)
American women dramatists and playwrights
American women screenwriters
American women television writers
21st-century American dramatists and playwrights
21st-century American women writers
Screenwriters from South Carolina
American television writers
21st-century American screenwriters